Carlos Galettini (born 1938) is a Silver Condor nominated Argentine film director, film producer and screenplay writer.

He worked mainly in the Cinema of Argentina. He directed Besos en la Frente in 1996.

References

External links

1938 births
Argentine film directors
Argentine screenwriters
Male screenwriters
Argentine male writers
Living people
Argentine people of Italian descent